This list is about Malmö FF players with between 25 and 99 league appearances. For a list of all Malmö FF players with a Wikipedia article, see Category:Malmö FF players. For the current Malmö FF first-team squad, see First-team squad.

Malmö Fotbollförening, also known simply as Malmö FF, is a Swedish professional association football club based in Malmö. The club is affiliated with Skånes Fotbollförbund (The Scanian Football Association), and plays its home games at Stadion. Formed on 24 February 1910, Malmö FF is the most successful club in Sweden in terms of trophies won. The club have won the most league titles of any Swedish club with twenty-one, a joint record eighteen Swedish championship titles and a record fourteen national cup titles. The team competes in Allsvenskan as of the 2015 season; this is Malmö FF's 15th consecutive season in the top flight, and their 80th overall. The main rivals of the club are Helsingborgs IF, IFK Göteborg and, historically, IFK Malmö.

Since playing their first competitive match, more than 480 players have made a league appearance for the club, many of whom have played between 25 and 99 matches. Former Allsvenskan top scorer Lars Larsson fell three short of 100 appearances for Malmö FF, scoring 52 goals in those matches. Pontus Jansson, Jimmy Durmaz, Daniel Majstorović, Jonas Thern, Mats Magnusson and Stefan Schwarz are among the former players who have been awarded league winners medals. Out of the players currently at the club, Swedish midfielder Simon Kroon is the closest player to 100 appearances; he has played 51 matches for Malmö FF.

As of 31 October 2015, a total of 155 players have played between 25 and 99 competitive matches for the club. Of those players, nine are still playing for the club and can add to their total.

Key

General
Appearances and goals are for first-team competitive league matches only, including Allsvenskan, Svenska Serien, Superettan and Division 2 matches. Substitute appearances included.
Players are listed according to the total number of league games played, the player with the most goals scored is ranked higher if two or more players are tied.
Positions are listed according to the tactical formations that were employed at the time. Thus the change in the names of defensive and midfield reflects the tactical evolution that occurred from the 1960s onwards. The year 1960 is used as a breaking point in this list for the use of names of defensive and midfield positions.

Table headers
 Nationality – If a player played international football, the country/countries he played for are shown. Otherwise, the player's nationality is given as their country of birth.
 Malmö FF career – The year of the player's first appearance for Malmö FF to the year of his last appearance.
 Appearances – The number of games played.
 Goals – The number of goals scored.

Players
Statistics correct as of match played 31 October 2015.

Footnotes

References

 
Players
Malmö, FF
Association football player non-biographical articles